The Center for Civilians in Conflict (CIVIC) is a Washington, D.C. based non-profit, non-governmental organization (NGO). CIVIC was founded in 2003 by Marla Ruzicka as the Campaign for Innocent Victims in Conflict. CIVIC works on behalf of civilians in conflict-zones, providing research and advocating to policymakers. CIVIC is a part of the Making Amends Campaign. CIVIC's mission statement reads: "Our mission is to work with armed actors and civilians in conflict to develop and implement solutions to prevent, mitigate and respond to civilian harm."

History

Center for Civilians in Conflict (CIVIC), formerly Campaign for Innocent Victims in Conflict, was founded by Marla Ruzicka in 2003. Marla, with the help of Senator Patrick Leahy, created a US-funded aid program dedicated to helping rebuild the lives of civilians unintentionally harmed by US combat operations. CIVIC works closely with the military and organizations such as NATO. Although Marla was killed by a suicide bomb in Baghdad in April 2005, her colleagues, friends and family continue to run CIVIC. The first staff members were hired in early 2006 and the organization expanded its mandate in early 2007 beyond Iraq and Afghanistan. CIVIC achievements include persuading the US Congress to develop programs that aid victims caught in the middle of widespread conflict.

Key concepts

Recognize 
CIVIC tells the stories of how conflict affects civilians, and advocates that policymakers and armed actors recognize their rights, publicly acknowledge when they have been harmed, and take their well-being into consideration before, during, and after the fighting.

Prevent 
CIVIC works with various armed actors to translate lessons learned and law into policies and practices that can prevent harm to civilians.

Protect 
CIVIC works with international organizations such as the United Nations and the African Union, as well as national militaries, to develop policies and build skills that enable them to protect civilians from those who would harm them.

Amend 
CIVIC advocates that armed actors and peacekeepers work with victims and survivors to offer appropriate amends to those injured and to the families of those killed. These may take the form of apologies and financial assistance. Whatever the form of amends, CIVIC has worked since 2003 to ensure the dignity of the victims and their families is recognized and respected.

Findings 
CIVIC released a report in 2009 on civilian harm in Northwest Pakistan. It was based on a United Nations Assistance Mission in Afghanistan report that estimated a 40% increase in the number of civilian deaths in 2008. Civic report concludes that civilian harm is compounded by widespread poverty and that while the Pakistani government does make amends most do not receive any due to deficiencies in compensation mechanisms and no effort from the US. Another survey released by an individual associated with CIVIC counted two thousand killed and four thousand injured. CIVICs reports suggest that the number of civilians killed and injured in war conflicts exceeds the number that the United States admits to.

Accomplishments

CIVIC partnered with the United States military to train US soldiers shipping out to Iraq and Afghanistan on avoiding civilians and how to compensate for any harm caused. CIVIC also worked with the American Civil Liberties Union to analyze civilian claims of damages and craft legislation to address shortfalls in the current system (the Civilian Claims Act). CIVIC successfully pressed the North Atlantic Treaty Organization member states to develop, fund, and ensure that a trust fund for war victims was in place.

CIVIC provided a military lawyer that worked with Harvard University to document US efforts to make amends to civilians suffering losses. They also organised for someone living in Afghanistan to help coordinate delivery of aid from NATO and the US to war victims. Over one-third of contributions to CIVIC come from individual contributions.

CIVIC received 10 million dollars from Congress as part of their initiative to advocate and help design a new US program for Pakistani war victims. CIVIC has conducted interviews with Pakistani and US policymakers, humanitarians and officials from international organizations, and over 160 Pakistani civilians.

In Afghanistan, CIVIC’s research in Afghanistan and advocacy in Brussels directly led to NATO approving its first amends policy for Afghan war victims. CIVIC’s advocacy in 2008-2009 led directly to the International Security Assistance Force (ISAF) command emphasis on civilian harm mitigation and a significant shift in tactics to avoid civilian harm. According to UN reports, pro-government elements, (which includes ISAF and Afghan forces) accounted for 39% of civilian deaths in 2008. By 2010 that percentage dropped to 15%, and declined further by 2013 to 11%.

In 2016, CIVIC conducted a six-month research project on the capabilities, gaps, and potential for civilian protection in the Ukrainian military and Ministry of Defense.

In 2017, CIVIC re-established a research and advocacy project in Mali to advance the protection of civilians through the UN peacekeeping operation, MINUSMA. Additionally, CIVIC successfully advocated for an increase in the capabilities of the peacekeeping operation in the Central African Republic (CAR) publishing "The Primacy of Protection: Delivering on the MINUSCA Mandate in the Central African Republic." In the Democratic Republic of Congo CIVIC published "Protection with Less Presence: How the Peacekeeping Operation in DRC Is Attempting to Deliver Protection with Fewer Resources," based on CIVIC's research regarding the impact of MONUSCO base closures.

Headquarters and offices

CIVIC is headquartered in Washington, DC and maintains field offices in New York, Nigeria, Iraq, the Kurdish region of Northern Iraq, and Afghanistan.

See also
 Human rights in Pakistan
 United Nations
 War in North-West Pakistan

References

External links

The results of CIVIC's massive campaign in Iraq

Advocacy groups in the United States
Non-profit organizations based in Washington, D.C.
Organizations established in 2003